Mian Khurshid Anwar was a Punjabi politician, journalist and former deputy opposition leader of Punjab Assembly.

Life and career
He was a member of the Provincial Assembly of the Punjab (MPA), representing Vehari in 1972  and in 1977.

References

External links
 Government of Punjab, Pakistan
 Punjab Assembly Website

Punjabi people
People from Vehari District